In baseball, a corked bat is a specially modified baseball bat that has been filled with cork or other lighter, less dense substances to make the bat lighter. A lighter bat gives a hitter a quicker swing and may improve the hitter's timing. Despite popular belief that corking a bat creates a "trampoline effect" causing a batted ball to travel farther, physics researchers have shown that this is not the case. In Major League Baseball, modifying a bat with foreign substances and using it in play is illegal and subject to ejection and further punishment.

Construction
Crushed cork, bouncy balls, sawdust, or other similar material is compacted into the hole and the end is typically patched up with glue and sawdust. However, this weakens the bat's structural integrity and makes it more susceptible to breakage, even more so if the cork is placed beyond six inches into the bat. Corked bats are sometimes discovered when they break during the moment of impact upon hitting a baseball.

Major League Baseball
Using a corked bat in Major League Baseball is in violation of Rule 6.03 (a)(5), which states
A batter is out for illegal action when:

(5) He uses or attempts to use a bat that, in the umpire's judgment, has been altered or tampered with in such a way to improve the distance factor or cause an unusual reaction on the baseball. This includes bats that are filled, flat-surfaced, nailed, hollowed, grooved or covered with a substance such as paraffin, wax, etc.

It has been a popular belief that the material used to cork a bat creates a "trampoline effect", causing a ball hit with a corked bat to travel farther than one hit with an uncorked bat. Research has shown this not to be the case.  Another perceived advantage of using a corked bat is its effect on the bat's weight. Corking a bat causes the bat to be lighter, which in turn allows the batter to swing it more quickly. However, the reduction in weight negatively affects the velocity of the ball as it leaves the bat, effectively cancelling out the advantage gained from a quicker bat speed.  A lighter bat can, however, create an advantage by allowing the batter to delay a swing for a fraction of a second, which would allow for more accuracy.

History of use
Since 1970, six players have been caught using corked bats. The following table summarizes these events:

Some of those six players may have been more guilty than others. Nettles avoided a suspension after explaining that the bat was given to him by a fan. Hatcher had used a teammate's bat after his own shattered, and was backed up on that claimed by his manager, Hal Lanier. Sabo also denied knowledge that his bat had been tampered with. On the flip side, Guerrero chased bat pieces after his lumber shattered, a rather unusual reaction, and later admitted to using it intentionally the prior few months. Belle's teammates broke into the umpire's room and exchanged the bat with an innocent one, but were caught doing so.

In addition, a number of former players have admitted to using corked bats. Former Kansas City Royals star Amos Otis is one of them. Another is former player announcer, and National League president Bill White. Former player and Major League manager Phil Garner admitted in January 2010 on a Houston radio station that he used a corked bat against Gaylord Perry and "hit a home run" with it. Garner also admitted that the 2005 Houston Astros used corked bats during the 2005 MLB season and 2005 World Series. In 2010, Deadspin reported that Pete Rose used corked bats during his 1985 pursuit of Ty Cobb's all-time hits record. Two sports memorabilia collectors who owned Rose's game-used bats from that season had the bats x-rayed and found the telltale signs of corking. Rose had previously denied using corked bats.

See also
Cheating in baseball

References

External links 
 Doctored bat infractions – ESPN.
 What about corked bats?

Baseball terminology
Baseball bats
Cheating in baseball
Banned sports tactics
Major League Baseball controversies